The Racine Formation is a geologic formation in Iowa. It preserves fossils dating back to the Silurian period.

See also

 List of fossiliferous stratigraphic units in Iowa
 Paleontology in Iowa

References
 

Silurian Iowa
Silurian geology of Wisconsin
Silurian southern paleotemperate deposits
Silurian southern paleotropical deposits